Antrocarcinus petrosus is a species of crab in the family Xanthidae, the only species in the genus Antrocarcinus.

References

Xanthoidea
Monotypic crustacean genera